Shihab Shaheen is a Bangladeshi film director, producer and screenwriter. He made his directorial debut in 2001 with a television drama "Ghurni". He made his breakthrough with the television serial, Romijer Ayna in 2005. His notable telefilm works include X-Factor, X-Factor 2, Bhalobashi Tai, Bhalobashi Tai Bhalobeshe Jai, Monforing er Golpo, Monsuba Junction, Nilpori Nilanjona, Nil Projapoti and Bini Shutor Taan.

In 2015, Shaheen directed his first feature film, Chuye Dile Mon starring Arifin Shuvoo and Zakia Bari Mamo, which was super hit and received mostly positive reviews from the critics and audiences. He is currently working on a web film, titled Jodi... Kintu... Tobuo for ZEE5. His other web works include Dwitiyo Kishore, Chena Pother Oporichita and Kuhok.

In 2019, Shaheen directed August 14, a crime thriller web series based on a true incident where a police officer & his wife were murdered by their own drug addict daughter at home in Dhaka.

Career

Early works
Shaheen was associated with a theater group while attending college in Feni, Bangladesh, where he had written and directed his first play titled Tit Potla in 1993. He joined another theater group, "Desh Natok" after moving to Dhaka, acted in a number of plays and took a six-month course on film direction from a private company. He went to make his first television drama, "Ghurni" starring Litu Anam and Bonna Mirza in 2001 which aired on NTV. After that, he made a number of telefilms including Ingit, Rupkoth, Dadir Lal Baksho and Gora Jamai, however, the turning point of his career was the 2005 drama serial, Romijer Ayna, which became very popular among audiences in the 2000s.

Drama and Telefilms
Since 2001, Shaheen has made more than 75 television dramas and telefilms. After Romijer Ayna, he made his first telefilm titled X Factor in 2008 for NTV starring Ziaul Faruq Apurba, Iresh Zaker, Rafiath Rashid Mithila, Mozeza Ashraf Monalisa and Jenny. Followed by its immense popularity, he went to make a sequel of the telefilm titled X Factor 2. Seven years later, he decided to direct the third and final installment of the telefilm, titled X Factor: Gameover after receiving a vast number of requests and demands from the viewers. It retained some of the original cast from X Factor 2, including Apurba, Iresh Zaker, Mithila and Farhana Mili and added Zakia Bari Mamo as a new character. It was written by Shihab Shaheen and Mesbah Uddin Sumon and produced jointly by Alpha I Media Production and Grameenphone. In 2017, he made another telefilm, titled X-Factor Reloaded, a reboot of the previous series which starred Siam Ahmed, Tawsif Mahbub, Sabnam Faria and Nadia Afrin Mim replacing the original cast.

In 2010, Shaheen directed a romantic telefilm Bhalobashi Tai, which aired on NTV on the occasion of Pahela Baishakh. It became very popular among the audiences and its title track “Jol Shopno” sung by Palbasha Siddique was a big hit. In 2011, he made another telefim titled, Bhalobashi Tai Bhalobeshe Jai on the occasion of Eid-ul-Adha starring Arifin Shuvoo, Sanjida Pritee, Joya Ahsan, Iresh Zaker, Nusrat Imroz Tisha and Omar Ayaz. Ihe telefilm broke the record of previous years and secured the highest TRP of the year (most watched drama program in a year).

Shaheen other notable television works include, Monforing er Golpo, Monsuba Junction, Nilpori Nilanjona, Rupkotha Ar Hoyna, Prem Ki Keboli Ekti Rashayonik Bikria?, Anamika, Bhalobashar Pongtimala, Jackson Billal, Shesh Porjonto, Bini Shutor Taan, Adittya Er Mounota and Obujh Diner Golpo.

Since 2019, Shaheen has made a number of web television series including Ditiyo Koishor, Chena Pother Oporichita, Kuhok and August 14.

Directorial debut and success
In 2015, Shaheen made his directorial debut with the romantic drama film Chuye Dile Mon starring Arifin Shuvoo and Zakia Bari Mamo, Iresh Zaker, Anondo Khaled, Quazi Nawshaba Ahmed and Misha Sawdagor. The story revolves around Abir and Nila portrayed by Shuvo and Mam, who fell in love from their very childhood, but grows apart as they mature. Later on in life, they happened to meet again accidentally, came close and revived their love, later on, the story takes another turn. The artists involved with the soundtrack for the film include Habib, Tahsan, Kona and others. It received mostly positive reviews from the critics and audience. Shaheen's direction was praised, and the film emerged as a major commercial success. It won maximum number of awards at 18th Meril Prothom Alo Awards and earned Shaheen his first Critic Choice Awards for Best Feature Film and a nomination for the Best Director (Film).

Shaheen's next directorial venture was Anarkali, which he announced to make with Tahsan Khan and Zakia Bari Mamo as stars which had been postponed later for further planning.

Personal life
Shaheen married to actress Zakia Bari Mamo in 2015. She is his second wife. He has a daughter from his first marriage.

Accolades

Works

Film

Television

Web works

References

External links
 

Living people
Web series directors
Bangladeshi filmmakers
Bangladeshi directors
Bangladeshi screenwriters
Bangladeshi film directors
Bangladeshi television directors
Year of birth missing (living people)
Islamic University, Bangladesh alumni